Isaac Newton Roop (March 13, 1822 – February 14, 1869) was a United States politician, pioneer and member of the Whig party. In 1859, he was the first elected (provisional) governor of the newly proposed Nevada Territory.

Early life 
Roop was born in Carroll County, Maryland.

Career
In 1851 William Nobles (guide) started taking settlers over a route through the Sierra Nevada passing through the Honey Lake valley; included among these settlers were the 29-year-old Isaac Roop and his family. His first three years in California were spent in Shasta County, in farming and trading. During this period he also held the positions of Postmaster and School Commissioner. He had accumulated in that time upwards of fifteen thousand dollars' worth of property, but in June 1853, lost it all by fire. It was then that Roop retreated to the Sierra Nevada and to Honey Lake, where he concentrated on his own backcountry holdings and nearly single-handedly erected the burg of Rooptown which he would later name for his daughter Susan.

In September 1859, Roop was elected the first territorial governor of the proposed Nevada Territory. At the time, Susanville was thought to be in Nevada instead of California. The new provisional government first convened on December 15, 1859, in the town of Genoa. Roop lived in the contested County of Roop. He was elected in 1861 to the new Nevada Territorial Senate.

After the county's dissolution in 1865, Roop returned to Susanville, California. Roop became Lassen County's district attorney for two terms.

Personal life 
On December 24, 1840, Roop married Nancy Gardner, his tutor. They had children: John, Isaiah and Susan. On June 20, 1850 Nancy died of typhoid fever.

Isaac Roop died in Susanville, California on February 14, 1869.   His daughter Susan Arnold resided in the town as well until her own death in 1921, and both were buried in the town's cemetery. There is a mural depicting father and daughter in uptown Susanville, on the outside wall of Johnson's Shoes.

Roop County, Nevada was named for him.

References

Further reading

External links

 
 Isaac Roop at WesternStarWiki
Lassen County, California GenWeb Project
Ancestry.com

1822 births
1869 deaths
California Whigs
19th-century American politicians
Governors of Nevada Territory
Members of the Nevada Territorial Legislature
Nevada Whigs
People from Susanville, California
People from Carroll County, Maryland
American city founders